Barber Extracting a Tooth is an oil-on-panel genre painting by Adriaen van Ostade, dated ca. 1630–1635, now in the Kunsthistorisches Museum in Vienna, Austria.

It shows a village barber pulling out a villager's tooth. Typically for the artist, the scene is illuminated from a window on the left, whilst the right remains in shadow. A set of scissors on the wall refers to the man's trade as a barber.

References

Paintings in the collection of the Kunsthistorisches Museum
1635 paintings
Paintings by Adriaen van Ostade